Geteau Ferdinand (born 19 May 1974) is a retired Haitian football goalkeeper who played for Valencia and the national team.

References

1974 births
Living people
Haitian footballers
Haiti international footballers
Association football goalkeepers
Valencia FC (Haiti) players
Ligue Haïtienne players
2000 CONCACAF Gold Cup players
2002 CONCACAF Gold Cup players